Yang Haonan (born 20 January 2003) is a Chinese artistic gymnast. In 2019, he won two silver medals and one bronze medal at the 2019 Junior World Artistic Gymnastics Championships held in Győr, Hungary. He won the silver medal both in the vault and parallel bars events. He also won the bronze medal in the rings.

References

External links 

 

Living people
2003 births
Place of birth missing (living people)
Chinese male artistic gymnasts
Medalists at the Junior World Artistic Gymnastics Championships
21st-century Chinese people